The Ventura County Air Pollution Control District (VCAPCD), formed in 1968, is the air pollution agency responsible mainly for regulating stationary sources of air pollution for Ventura County. The District was formed  by the Board of Supervisors in response to the county's first air pollution study which identified Ventura County as having a severe air quality problem.  

Currently, Ventura County does not meet the federal air quality standard for ozone and exceeds the state standard for ozone and particulate matter.

VCAPCD organizational structure
The VCAPCD is governed by the Air Pollution Control Board. This 10-member board consists of the County Board of Supervisors and five elected officials representing Ventura County cities. The APC Board establishes policy and approves new rules. They also appoint the Air Pollution Control Officer, the District Hearing Board, Advisory Committee, and Clean Air Fund Advisory Committee.  The Air Pollution Control Officer (APCO) of the VCAPCD reports to the APC Board and the following divisions report to the APCO:

VCAPCD Divisions
The VCAPCD has a staff of about fifty employees including inspectors, engineers, planners, technicians, and support staff. The District is divided into the following divisions:

Administrative Services
Information Systems
Public Information
Planning and Evaluation
Rules and Incentives
Pass-Through Grants
Compliance
Engineering
Monitoring

Hearing Board
The APCD Hearing Board is a  quasi-judicial body established by state law to grant variances and uphold or overturn APCD decisions regarding permit denials and operating conditions on permits. The Hearing Board may also revoke permits to operate, issue orders of abatement, allow citizen appeals, and settle disputes between the District and permittees. 

The Hearing Board consists of five members appointed by the Air Pollution Control Board for three-year terms.

Current members are:

Gary Gasperino - Engineering (Chair)
Stephen C. Hurlock, Ph.D - Public (Vice Chair)
Daniel J. Murphy - Law
Mike Stubblefield - Public

Advisory Committee
The VCAPCD Advisory Committee is a twenty-member citizens advisory body appointed by the Air Pollution Control Board. The Committee reviews staff proposed new and revised rules, and makes recommendations to the Air Pollution Control Board on those rules.
 
Current Committee members are:

Duane Vander Pluym, Ventura (Chair)
Sara Head, District 1 (Vice Chair)
Scott Blough, Simi Valley
Raymond Garcia, District 2
Robert Cole, Camarillo
Richard Cook, Santa Paula
Todd Gernheuser, Fillmore
Aaron Hanson, District 4
Michael Kuhn, District 4
Kim Lim, District 5
Marleen Luckman, Ojai
Hugh McTernan, District 1
Brandon Millan, Thousand Oaks
Keith Moore, District 5
David S. Morse, District 3
Richard S. Nick, District 3
Ronald Peterson, District 2
Steven Wolfson, Moorpark
Vacancy, Oxnard
Vacancy, Port Hueneme

Main District Goals
The VCAPCD works with business and industry to reduce emissions from new and existing sources to protect public health and agriculture from the adverse effects of air pollution for over 800,000 county residents.

The District has stated the following goals for 2010-2011:

 Attainment of federal and state ambient air quality standards.
 Implement the requirements of the California Clean Air Act and 1990 Amendments to the federal Clean Air Act.
 Continue public awareness program and education program.
 Develop attainment plans for a new U.S. Environmental Protection Agency (EPA) ambient air quality standards.

See also
 California Air Resources Board
 California Center for Sustainable Energy
 California Code of Regulations
 California Energy Commission
 California Environmental Protection Agency
 Climate change in California
 Ecology of California
 Emission standards
 Greenhouse gas
 Greenhouse gas emissions by the United States
 List of California Air Districts
 NAAQS (National Ambient Air Quality Standards)
 NESHAP (National Emissions Standards for Hazardous Air Pollutants)
 Pollution in California
 Public Smog
 South Coast Air Quality Management District
 Timeline of major US environmental and occupational health regulation
 US Emission standard

References

External links
Official Ventura County Air Pollution Control District—VCAPCD website
California Local Air District Directory

Air pollution in California
Government of Ventura County, California
Environmental agencies in the United States
Environmental agencies of country subdivisions
Atmospheric dispersion modeling
Special districts of California
Southern California